Jon Cross (born December 7, 1979) is a member of the Ohio House of Representatives, currently representing the 83rd district which consists of Hancock, Hardin and portions of Logan counties in northwestern Ohio. Cross is a Republican. A graduate of Ohio State University, Cross previously served as the president/CEO and economic development director for the Hardin County Chamber & Business Alliance.

In 2018, Cross won the Republican primary to succeed Robert Sprague in the 83rd district of the Ohio House of Representatives, defeating Cheryl Buckland.  Sprague had vacated the seat to run for Ohio State Treasurer.  Winning the primary, Cross would go on to easily win the general election, defeating Mary Harshfield with nearly 70% of the vote.

In 2019, Cross co-sponsored legislation that would ban abortion in Ohio and criminalize what they called "abortion murder". Doctors who performed abortions in cases of ectopic pregnancy and other life-threatening conditions would be exempt from prosecution only if they "[took] all possible steps to preserve the life of the unborn child, while preserving the life of the woman. Such steps include, if applicable, attempting to reimplant an ectopic pregnancy into the woman's uterus". Reimplantation of an ectopic pregnancy is not a recognized or medically feasible procedure.

References

Links 

 Representative Jon Cross (official site)

Living people
1981 births
Ohio Republicans
Ohio State University alumni
21st-century American politicians
American chief executives